Mutru is a Finnish surname. Notable people with this surname include:

Leevi Mutru (born 1995), Finnish Nordic combined skier
Pertti Mutru (1930–1964), Finnish basketball player

Finnish-language surnames